Ted Matlak was the alderman of the 32nd ward in Chicago from 1998 until 2007. On April 17, 2007, Matlak lost to challenger Scott Waguespack in a close aldermanic race.

Background
Matlak was born in Chicago near the 2500 block of Marshfield in a tavern to Priscilla Gordon and the son of Polish immigrants, Theodore Matlak Sr. His younger sister now resides there with her children and his parents. Matlak was appointed alderman by former alderman Theris Gabinski and was an intern to ex-Congressman Dan Rostenkowski while attending page school in Washington D.C. He graduated from Gordon College Prep, and originally intended on joining the U.S. army. Unfortunately, health issues relating to his kidneys prevented such a career, and he instead proceeded to attend DePaul University in Chicago, where he received an accounting degree. In 1991, he married Gail and later he had 2 daughters: Emily and Aubrey Matlak.

Matlak has received two kidney transplants: one in 1993 and one in 2004.

Politics

Early career
He had interned with Dan Rostenkowski and worked  in the ward office of former alderman Terry Gabinski.

Aldermanic career
Matlak served as 32nd ward alderman in Chicago for nine years, from 1998 to 2007.

He was appointed in 1998 by Mayor Richard M. Daley to finish the term of Theris Gabinski, and was elected outright in 1999. He subsequently was again reelected in 2003. In 2003, his challenger was Jay Stone, son of 50th ward alderman Bernard Stone. Bernard Stone not only supported Matlak, but publicly criticized his son for running. In 2007 opponent was newcomer Scott Waguespack, who beat him in a tight race by only 121 votes in 2007. Among some of his accomplishments during his aldermanic career were having several Chicago Public Parks built and having a new Chicago Public Library built.

Subsequent political endeavors
Matlak lost the February 2, 2010 Democratic Primary Election for Commissioner of the 12th District of the Cook County Board to politician John Fritchey.

Electoral history

References

Chicago City Council members
Living people
DePaul University alumni
Illinois Democrats
1965 births